The Jing An Shangri-La  is a luxury hotel located within the Jing An Kerry Centre in Shanghai's Jing'an District, in China. The hotel, which is part of the Shangri-La Hotels and Resorts chain, consists of 508 guest rooms within the centre's top 29 floors.

References

External links

 
 

Hotels in Shanghai
Jing'an District
Shangri-La Hotels and Resorts
Hotel buildings completed in 2013
Hotels established in 2013